William O'Donnell may refer to:

 William O'Donnell (cricketer) (born 1997), New Zealand cricketer
 William O'Donnell (Irish politician) (died 1947), Irish politician in the Dáil Éireann
 William O'Donnell (Wisconsin politician) (1922–2002), American politician from Wisconsin
 Bill O'Donnell (harness racer) (born 1948), Canadian harness racer
 Bill O'Donnell (sportscaster) (1926–1982), American sportscaster
 William O'Donnell (swimmer) (born 1942), British swimmer
Willie O'Donnell, hurler, see List of Interprovincial Hurling Championship finals